William Coddington Jr. (18 January 1651 – 5 February 1689) was an early governor of the Colony of Rhode Island and Providence Plantations, serving two consecutive terms from 1683 to 1685.

Biography
Coddington was the son of William Coddington who served many terms as governor of the two towns of Portsmouth and Newport in the Colony of Rhode Island and Providence Plantations, and later as the governor of all the united towns of the colony.  Young Coddington was the sixth of 13 children of his father. He was the first child of his father's third wife, Anne Brinley, the daughter of Thomas and Anna (Wase) Brinley.

Coddington was born and raised in Newport, and became a freeman there in 1675 at the age of 24.  He began his political career in 1679 when he was chosen as deputy of the colony for a year, and then became assistant the following two years.  In 1683 he was appointed as governor of the colony and served in this capacity for two years.  He never married, and died at the age of 38. He was buried in the Coddington Cemetery in Newport.

See also

 List of colonial governors of Rhode Island

References

External links
Chronological list of Rhode Island leaders

1651 births
1689 deaths
17th-century Quakers
Colonial governors of Rhode Island
Politicians from Newport, Rhode Island
Burials at Coddington Cemetery